Krazy, born Michael Wilson, is an American rapper from New Orleans, Louisiana, United States. He formally started his music career in a rap group called, Murder Inc. Krazy later signed to No Limit Records and joined the 504 Boyz in 2000.

Career

1994-97: Music beginning
Crazy formally started his music career in 1994 when he signed to independent New Orleans record label, Hard Head Records and became a member of the rap group, Murder Inc. with artists Legend Man, MC L and Alamo. Their debut album entitled; "Playin' For Keeps" was released on September 25, 1995. They would release a second and final album, entitled; "Let's Die Together" in 1997 named in tribute to the passing of their CEO/founder of Hard Head Records, Roderick Smith whom was shot and killed in May 1996. Crazy and Legend Man signed to a second independent record label, Ruff Era Records in 1996–1997. Legend Man signed in 1996, and Crazy followed in 1997, along with MC L signing to Bally Boy Records and Alamo deciding to end her rap career.

1998–99: Solo career
Crazy started his solo career in 1997 when he signed to New Orleans record label, Ruff Era Records. His debut 'solo' album, entitled; "I Shed Tears For The World" was released on July 21, 1998, and would be declared one of the "Best of the Best Top 204 Independent Rap Albums" by Murder Dog Magazine. On August 10, 1999, he released his second studio album, entitled; "Please Don't Kill Me" titled in reference to the controversial subject of abortion.

2000–04: No Limit, 504 Boyz, etc.
He joined Master P's newly formed rap group the 504 Boyz in 2000, appearing as 'Krazy'. His third studio album "Breather Life" was released in 2001 by a No Limit Records subsidiary label Soulja Army Records. It reached No. 91 on the Top R&B/Hip-Hop Albums and No. 31 on the Top Independent Albums charts.

He released his fourth and final studio album "Us Killing Us" in 2004 on his own label, Breather Entertainment.

Discography

Studio albums

Collaboration albums

Singles

As featured artist

References

African-American male rappers
Living people
No Limit Records artists
Rappers from New Orleans
Gangsta rappers
21st-century American rappers
1976 births
21st-century American male musicians
21st-century African-American musicians
20th-century African-American people